The 1953 Furman Purple Hurricane football team was an American football team that represented Furman University as a member of the Southern Conference (SoCon) during the 1953 college football season. Led by fourth-year head coach Bill Young, the Purple Hurricane compiled an overall record of 7–2 with a mark of 2–0 in conference play, placing second in the SoCon.

Schedule

References

Furman
Furman Paladins football seasons
Furman Purple Hurricane football